Dean Valli (born October 5, 1983 in North Vancouver, British Columbia) is an offensive lineman with the Canadian Football League's British Columbia Lions. Valli attended Simon Fraser University and played for their football team, the Simon Fraser Clan. He played four full seasons with the Clan from 2002 to 2005.  Dean graduated with a bachelor of arts from Simon Fraser University in 2006. In 2005, Valli was named to the Canada West Universities Athletic Association all-star team. He also represented SFU at the 2005 East West Bowl held in Waterloo, Ontario. Valli was selected in the 1st round, 6th overall, by the Lions in the 2006 CFL draft. 2006 was his first year playing professional football.

Valli retired on February 4, 2016, after 10 seasons with the club.

References

External links
BC Lions bio 

1983 births
Living people
BC Lions players
Canadian football offensive linemen
People from North Vancouver
Players of Canadian football from British Columbia
Simon Fraser Clan football players